The 1983 Donnay Indoor Championships was a men's tennis tournament played on indoor carpet courts in Brussels in Belgium the event was part of the 1983 Volvo Grand Prix. The tournament was held from 7 March through 13 March 1983. Fifth-seeded Peter McNamara defeated Ivan Lendl in the final of the singles event, despite trailing 4–5 and 0–30 on Lendl's serve, to win the title and the accompanying $50,000 first-prize money.

Finals

Singles

 Peter McNamara defeated  Ivan Lendl, 6–4, 4–6, 7–6
 It was McNamara's only singles title of the year and the fifth and last of his career.

Doubles

 Heinz Günthardt /  Balázs Taróczy defeated  Hans Simonsson /  Mats Wilander, 6–2, 6–4

References

Donnay Indoor Championships
Donnay
+